Doritte (Dorothea) Nippers (died 1571), was a Danish woman who was executed for sorcery.

Nippers was a widow with one daughter, and a successful hawker in Helsingör, where she is noted to have been the leader of a group of businesswomen, referred to as "Doritte and her gang". She was involved in a long going conflict with her male business competitors Per Boesen and Bent Hallandsfarer.

In 1551, she was put on trial accused of not paying her taxes and of buying up the products of the farmers before they could put it for sale.
She defended herself, won the case and was acquitted of all charges, and warned Per Boesen and Bent Hallandsfarer with divine punishment if they continued to meddle in her business methods. During the following years, the law about women's rights to conduct business was tightened in Denmark as they was not given the status of family providers, and several laws were issued which worsened their terms, such as the ban of women's rights to trade between  Helsingør and Helsingborg, and the well known business conflicts of Nippers took place against these changes in Danish business life.

In 1571, she was again sued for illegal business transactions. However, this time, the charge included an accusation of witchcraft, and she was pointed out as the witch colleague to another female hawker, Karine Lass Munchs. Doritte Nippers denied the charges. However, she also denied having been involved in the 1551 case, which destroyed her credibility and contributed to her guilty verdict, as she was assumed to be lying about the witch charge as well. Karine Lass Munchs was freed because of the support of her family and other character witnesses, but Nippers was burned at the stake in late 1571.

References 

 Dansk kvindebiografisk leksikon: Doritte Nippers

1571 deaths
People executed for witchcraft
People executed by Denmark by burning
16th-century Danish businesswomen
16th-century Danish businesspeople
Witch trials in Denmark